The Chicago International REEL Shorts Festival is an annual short film competition and screening put on by Project Chicago. The festival was founded by Scott Rudolph and Nels Dahlquist. Held annually, this three-day event plays host to more than 150 films (all under 35 minutes) from many countries throughout the world.

In 2017 the venue changed to Chicago Filmmakers' Firehouse Cinema located at 1326 W Hollywood Ave in the city of Chicago. 

Some venues in years past include Columbia College's beautiful penthouse theater. 

In 2004 and 2005 the 3-Penny Cinema, in Chicago's Lincoln Park district, was the main venue. In 2006 REEL Shorts moved to the historic Davis Theatre in Lincoln Square. In 2007, 2009. 2009 Columbia College came on as a presenting sponsor and the festival is to be held at Columbia's Film Row Theatre.

Particular years

2021 
The 18th edition of the Chicago International REEL Shorts Festival was originally scheduled for November 2021 but was postponed due to Covid-19. The festival returned to Chicago Filmmakers' Firehouse Cinema for in-person screenings from March 18-19, 2022.

2020 
Festival dates: Streamed online November 14 - December 5

Winners
Best of the Fest: 6 Months in 2063
Best Arts Short: Dear COVID-19
Best Comedy Short: She Had It Coming
Best Documentary Short: NINE
Best Sci-Fi, Action, Horror Short: 6 Months in 2063
Best Growing Up, Growing Older Short: Miracle of Science
Best Drama Short Film: Glimmer
Honorable Mention & Judges Selections:
Superhero Me
Carny Trash
Nameless Forest
The Bottle

2019
The 2019 Chicago International REEL Shorts Festival was help at Chicago Filmmakers' Firehouse Cinema located at 1326 W Hollywood Ave in the city of Chicago.

WINNERS

BEST SHORT FILM -  
Minor Accident of War - Jakob Satzaria 

SEMI-FINALIST SHORT FILM -  
Anxiety - Tridib Chakraborty 

AUDIENCE  CHOICE AWARDS

Pageant Mom, Down
Dickie & Bea
Ballhawks
Just Give Me a Minute to Change
The Sweatshirt

Programmers Awards

Best Foreign
Rock On, Dude!

Best Drama
Broken

Best Animation
King of the House

Best Comedy
Dickie & Bea

Best Musical Short
The Odyssey of Cleve Eaton

Best Documentary
Uncaged: A Stand-In Story
 
Best Horror
Keep Looking
 
Best Action
Vicarious
 
Best Sci-Fi
Dissidence (2084)

2018
Festival dates: November 9-10

Winners
Best Short Film: Sac de Merde
Best Animation: Ian
Best Drama: Tin Can
Best Documentary: Scenes From A Visit
Best Music Video: It's The Dystopian Future!
Best Comedy: William Flugle's Travel Adventures with William Flugle
Best Web Series: Geek Lounge
Spotlight Award: Heather Has Four Moms
Programmers Choice: Leia's Army
Best SciFi: The Replacement
Audience Choice Awards:
Businessmen
Tin Can
Dear Dark Lord
Leia's Army
Midnight

2017
Festival dates: November 10-11

Winners
Best Short Film: Confession
Best Drama: Counting
Best Comedy: ctrl-alt-delete
Best Animation: La Postina
Best Foreign Language: Slush Ice
Best Documentary: Calvin's Story
Best Webisodic/New Media: Open Mic
Best Experimental: Delicatessen
Best Young Filmmaker: Recess
Best Horror: Ding Dong
Audience Choice Awards:
To Those With Good Intent
Rockabye
Sputnik
Tinder is the Night
Tracker

2016
Festival dates: December 2-3

Winners
Best Short Film: Easy Life
Best Drama: Muhammad Ali - The Olive Branch
Best Comedy: That's Love
Best Animation: Riptide Rhapsody
Best Quirky Film: The Uptowners
Best Documentary: Superfan
Best TV Pilot/Webisode: Curfeud Episode 1
Audience Choice Awards:
Superfan
Three of a Kind
Secrets We Keep
Carfield
Sojourn
Hard Knock Robots
Boy

2015
Festival dates: December 11-12

Winners
Best Short Film: Who is Riley Oakes
Best Drama: The Decision
Best Comedy: Moving On
Best Documentary: The Simple Gift of the Walnut Grove
Best Animation: An Ode to Love
Best Director: We Interrupt This Broadcast
Best Horror/Suspense: Awakenings
Best Science Fiction: Welcome to Forever
Audience Choice Awards:
The ART POLICE
El Capo de Capos
F the Moon
Bark Mitzvah
Out of Touch
The Champion
Family Meal
In the Dark

2014 
Festival dates: October 9–12

Winners
Best Short Film: The King of URL'S
Best Drama: The Cut/ Le Coupe
Best Comedy: Lez Be Honest
Best Documentary: Cloth Paper Dreams
Best Animation: Desmondo Ray
Best Actor: The Discount of Ed Telfair - Jeff Bailey
Best Actress: Lez Be Honest - Christine Rodriguez
Best Supporting Actor: The King of URL'S - Adam Poss
Best Supporting Actress: I Can See You - Brenda Strong
Best Director: Vigilante - Benedict Sanderson
Best Cinematography: Cloth Paper Dreams - Travis Tank
Best Editing: Une balade a la mer - Damien Stein
Audience Choice Awards:
Journeyman
Deflated, Twinkies & Donuts, magiCATastrophe
The Amazing Mr. Ash
Lucy
Vigilante
Beyond the Mat
Post Reality
The Heebie-Jeebies
Love You Still
The King of URL'S

2004
Festival dates: September 17–19

Winners
Best Short Film: Directing Rye
Best Cinematography: Just Like You Imagined
Best Animation: The Lester Show
Best Comedy: Unemployed
Best SciFi Short: Untitled 003: Embryo
Best Documentary: The Harvest
Best Music Video: Drunken Liar
Creepiest Short: Victim
Audience Choice Awards:
Two To Tango
Robot Boy
Untitled 003: Embryo
Rocketscience
Reservations
Very Proud House
The Fridge
Unemployed
Victim
Fly Away
Notes from the Space Time Continuum
Fishing For Trauster
Honorable mention:
Edmund
Consideration
SPIN
Sunday Morning Stripper
The Next
Gay By Dawn
Euro American

2005
Festival dates: September 30 - October 2

Winners
Best Short Film of 2005: SKYLAB
Best Sci-Fi: Alliance
Best Horror: Short Shadow Man
Best Documentary: Kings of Christmas
Best Comedy: Dating Tips for Seniors
Best Youth Film: My First Kiss
Best Animation: Emilia
Best Music Video: High Speed Scene
Best Action Film: Lucky (Australian)
Best Foreign (tie): Hamoudi & Emil / Le Carnet Rouge
Best Experimental (tie): Allison / Jane Lloyd
Audience Choice Awards:
Totem Pole
Skylab
Alliance
I Spy With My Little Eye
Pumpkin of Nyefar
Wishtaker
You're Breaking Up
Flatbush
Gopher Broke
Mr. Dramatic
Lucky (Australian Action Film)
Roadkill
Breaking into Bollywood
Poet of Canis
I Killed Zoe Day
Good Vibrations
Honorable mention:
TOXIN
Duct Tape + Cover
MJD
SHOES
13 Waffles
Wishtaker
Detroit: Not for Wimps

2006
Festival dates: September 29 - October 1

Winners
Best of Fest: La La Land
Best Animation: Dry Sky
Best Horror Film: Recently Deceased
Best Documentary Short: Rising Above the Wave
Best Music Video: Melody Nife
Best Youth Short: Winter Attack
Audience Choice Awards:
Get Me Brenda Vaccaro
Keg of the Dead
La La Land
An American Revolution
Nowakowsky
Like Father Like Edison
The World's Most Dangerous Polka Band
Imbroglio
Snoozer
The Life and Death of a Pumpkin
Searching for Mr. Stupendo
Great American Youth
Honorable mention:
Nowakowsky

2007
Festival dates: September 21–23

Winners
Best of Fest: The Trainee
Best Comedy: The Planning Lady
Best Music Video: 1992
Best Scifi: D-I-M, Deus in Machina
Best Chicago Film: The European Kid
Best Documentary: Ghost Town: 24 Hours in Terlingua
Best Animation: I Met the Walrus
Audience Choice Awards:
The Meter
The Planning Lady
Land of the Free
Two Days Notice
Dog Jack
The Trainee
W.O.R.M. - Worldwide Organic Replicating Molecule
Call of Nature
Unraveling
Release
The Von
Honorable mention:
Mommy! Mommy! There's a Monster on the Stairs!

2008
Festival dates: September 11–14

Winners
Best of the Fest: Science Fair
Best Comedy: Home Cooked Meal
Best Music Video: The Life Here
Best Chicago Film: Greg's Leg
Best Documentary: Baby Face
Best Animation: The Flower
Best Youth Film: Super Kitten and the Power Pets
Audience Choice Awards:
Small Comforts
Looking Up Dresses
Near Miss
Living with Landmines
Find My Way
The Un-Gone
Miracle Investigators
Mallow
Last Dance
Directors Cut
PUSH
A Man's Image
Honorable mentions:
Y Not
Terminus
Piñatas Revenge
Verboten

2009
Festival dates: September 10–14

Winners

Best of the Fest:  Sky People
Best Break-Up Film: L.O.V.E.
Best Romantic Comedy: True Love
Best Youth Entry: Sparks in the Night
Best Artistic Movie: Stringing in the Streets
Best Romantic Movie: A Time of Flowers
Best Revenge Movie: Alessandra
Best Music Video: City of Noise
Best Horror Movie: Tinglewood
Most Disturbing Movie: Grandma's House
Best Foreign Film: Stella
Best Political Drama: October Surprise
Best Comedy: A Small Silent Film About Death
Best Demented Movie: Fish & Chip
Most Profane Statement: James K. Polk was @#?!ing Awesome
Honorable Mention:
Melt Down
Max & Helena
More Than You Can Chew
CAMFBH
Ex-Bully
WoW! What A Great Question!
My First Experimental Film
The Only One
The Disconnection of Cyrus Bent
People's Choice Awards: Under The Table In Barcelona, At Last, Okemah!

References

External links
Official site

Film festivals in Chicago
Short film festivals in the United States